Nothospondias is a genus of plants in the family Simaroubaceae. It contains the sole species Nothospondias staudtii, native to Cameroon, Côte d'Ivoire, Gabon, Ghana, and Nigeria. It is a dioecious tree.

References

Simaroubaceae
Monotypic Sapindales genera
Taxonomy articles created by Polbot